Gene McArtor was the head baseball coach at Missouri from 1974-1994 and was the NCAA National Coordinator of Baseball Umpires for many years beginning in 2008.

Early life
A native of St. Louis, MO, McArtor graduated from Webster Groves High School in 1958.

Playing career
McArtor was a first baseman at the University of Missouri from 1961 to 1963 under head coach Hi Simmons. In 1963, McArtor earned first-team All-Big 8 Conference honors and All-District V honors. McArtor helped lead Missouri to back-to-back Big 8 Conference Championships and to appearances in the 1962 and 1963 College World Series.

Coaching career
After teaching and coaching in St. Louis, in 1969, McArtor returned to Missouri as an assistant baseball coach under Hi Simmons. Upon Simmons' retirement after the 1973 season, McArtor took over as head coach in 1974, a position he would hold for the next 21 seasons. In 21 seasons, McArtor suffered just one losing season.

McArtor led Missouri to Big 8 Conference championships in 1976 and 1980 and to appearances in the NCAA tournament in 1976, 1978, 1980, 1981, 1988, and 1991.

McArtor coached 41 All-Big 8 Conference players and 13 All-Americans. He coached a number of players who went on to play Major League Baseball, including Jeff Cornell, Tim Laudner, Ron Mathis, Phil Bradley, Scott Little, Dave Otto, Dave Silvestri, and John Dettmer.

Legacy
McArtor was inducted into the American Baseball Coaches Association Hall of Fame in 1993.

In 1997 McArtor received the Lefty Gomez Award from the American Baseball Coaches Association for his contributions to the game of baseball.

In 1999 McArtor was inducted into the University of Missouri Intercollegiate Athletics Hall of Fame.

In 2007 McArtor was inducted into the Missouri Sports Hall of Fame.

In 2010 the new indoor baseball facility at the University of Missouri was named McArtor Baseball Facility in his honor.

Head coaching record

References

External links
Missouri Tigers Bio 

Living people
Missouri Tigers baseball coaches
Missouri Tigers baseball players
Webster Groves High School alumni
Year of birth missing (living people)